Tim or Timothy Kelly may refer to:

 Tim Kelly (Alaska politician) (1944–2009), Alaska state legislator
 Tim Kelly (Minnesota politician) (born 1964), Minnesota politician and a member of the Minnesota House of Representatives
 Tim Kelly (Michigan politician) (born 1956), member of the Michigan House of Representatives
 Tim Kelly (Tennessee politician) (born 1967), mayor of Chattanooga
 Tim Kelly (footballer) (born 1994), Australian footballer for West Coast
 Tim Kelly (musician) (1963–1998), American guitarist for the band Slaughter
 Tim Kelly (playwright) (1937–1998), American playwright
 Tim David Kelly, American musician, songwriter and record producer
 Tim T. Kelly, American media executive, film producer, and conservationist
 Tim Kelly (American football) (born 1986), American football coach
 Timothy Kelly (sports executive), American lacrosse executive
 Timothy J. Kelly (born 1969), United States District Judge

See also
 Tim O'Kelly (1941–1990), American actor